Robert David Fulton (born May 13, 1929) is an American politician who briefly served as the 37th governor of Iowa during the first 16 days of 1969. He also served as the lieutenant governor of Iowa from 1965 to 1969.

Early life and education
Fulton was born in Waterloo, Iowa, and graduated from Waterloo East High School. He earned a Bachelor of Science degree from the State University of Iowa and a Juris Doctor from the State University of Iowa College of Law.

Career 
A Democrat, he served as a member of the Iowa House of Representatives from 1958 to 1960, followed by a term as a member of the Iowa Senate from 1962 to 1964. He then ran for and won the office of lieutenant governor. He served in that role from January 17, 1965 to January 1, 1969. He then served briefly as governor from January 1 to January 16, 1969, following Governor Harold Hughes' election to the United States Senate and subsequent resignation. Fulton was the last Democrat to serve as Governor of Iowa until the 1999 inauguration of Tom Vilsack.

The office of Iowa governor was taken over by Robert D. Ray on January 16, 1969. Ray had won the gubernatorial election in November 1968, but, as per the state constitution, was not eligible to assume the role of governor until that day. Fulton later ran for a full term as governor in 1970, but was defeated by Ray. After leaving the governor's office, Fulton served as a member of the Democratic National Committee, and was a delegate to the 1972 Democratic National Convention.

References

|-

1929 births
Living people
Democratic Party members of the Iowa House of Representatives
Democratic Party Iowa state senators
Democratic Party governors of Iowa
Politicians from Waterloo, Iowa
Lieutenant Governors of Iowa
20th-century American politicians